Chichos can refer to:

posole of fresh corn
Los Chichos